AAE may refer to:

Aviation
 Above aerodrome elevation, an altitude given as above the nearest aerodrome or airport
 Académie de l'air et de l'espace, the French national Air and Space Academy
 Xpress Air (ICAO airline designator) in the United States
 Rabah Bitat Airport (IATA airport code) in Annaba, Algeria
 Australian airExpress, a cargo airline based in Melbourne, Australia

Languages
 African-American English, a linguistic variety spoken by many African Americans
 Australian Aboriginal English, varieties of English used by many Aboriginal Australians
 Arbëresh language, a language of Italy

Organizations
 Actuarial Association of Europe
 American Association of Endodontists, a professional organization
 Association of American Educators, a nonprofit nonunion professional teachers association
 Australasian Antarctic Expedition

Other uses
 Acetylajmaline esterase, an enzyme
 Acquired angioedema, a type of angioedema, a blood disease
 Adobe After Effects, digital motion graphics and visual effects software
 ARM Accredited Engineer program, an accreditation program for software developers
 Academy for Academic Excellence, a K-12 public charter school located in California
 All About Eve, a 1950 American drama film